The 1910 Ohio State Buckeyes football team was an American football team that represented Ohio State University during the 1910 college football season.  In their first season under head coach Howard Jones, the Buckeyes compiled a 6–1–3 record and outscored their opponents by a combined total of 182 to 27.

Schedule

References

Ohio State
Ohio State Buckeyes football seasons
Ohio State Buckeyes football